Miss Burgundy is a French beauty pageant which selects a representative for the Miss France national competition from the region of Burgundy. The first Miss Burgundy was crowned in 1963, although the title was not used regularly until 1993.

The current Miss Burgundy is Lara Lebretton, who was crowned Miss Burgundy 2022 on 9 October 2022. Three women from Burgundy have been crowned Miss France:
Arlette Collot, who was crowned Miss France 1964, and later dethroned
Sonia Rolland, who was crowned Miss France 2000
Marine Lorphelin, who was crowned Miss France 2013

Results summary
Miss France: Arlette Collot (1963; dethroned); Sonia Rolland (1999); Marine Lorphelin (2012)
1st Runner-Up: Maria Dornier (1964); Nathalie Pereira (1993); Lucie Degletagne (2003)
3rd Runner-Up: Célia Jourdheuil (1998); Vicky Michaud (2007); Sophie Diry (2019)
4th Runner-Up: Sophie Roger (1994); Lou-Anne Lorphelin (2020)
6th Runner-Up: Maud Aguilar (1997)
Top 12/Top 15: Sandrine Caire (1988); Cendrine Laurencin (1992); Angélique Viero (2004); Elodie Paillardin (2011); Marie Reintz (2013)

Titleholders

Notes

References

External links

Miss France regional pageants
Beauty pageants in France
Women in France